Niederraunau is a quarter of the town Krumbach in Günzburg (district), Swabia, Bavaria, Germany.

Geography 
Niederraunau (Elevation 518 m) is in the valley of the little river Kammel two kilometres south of Krumbach in the natural region Lower Iller-Lech Gravel Plateau. The hills between the valleys of Kammel and the neighboring valleys of Günz and Mindel are covered with forest. Niederraunau has a station at the Mittelschwaben Railway and it is at the Bundesstraße 16.

History 
 Between 1100 and 1200: Niederraunau was founded
 Between 1494 and 1495: the village got the right to hold a market
 1613: the village was given a coat of arms
 After World War II: Niederraunau was the site of a post World War II American sector displaced person camp.
 1978: Niederraunau became a quarter of the town Krumbach; before this time the village was its own municipality.

Sights and attractions 
Sights and attractions found in Niederraunau include:
 The castle of 
 The church Hlgst. Dreifaltigkeit (mentioned in the year 1067; was at the beginning romanesque; between 1617 and 1629 the church got its current look)
 A penitence cross from the medieval era at the Bundesstraße 16
 The

Companies and organizations
Companies and organizations based in Niederraunau include:
 FAIST Anlagenbau GmbH, a manufacturer of noise control facilities and aero-acoustic wind tunnel treatments
 Scheppach, a manufacturer of building machinery

References 

Populated places in Günzburg (district)
Villages in Bavaria